To My Beloved is a 2012 South Korean television series starring Kim Min-jun, Park Sol-mi, Hong Jong-hyun and Choi Yeo-jin. Based on the Japanese novel Dear You by Hisashi Nozawa, it aired on JTBC from June 27 to August 16, 2012.

Synopsis
Choi Eun-hyuk (Kim Min-jun) and Seo Chan-joo (Park Sol-mi) have been married for three years. They start looking back of the years they spent together when their past lovers come into their lives.

Cast

Main
 Kim Min-jun as Choi Eun-hyuk
 Park Sol-mi as Seo Chan-joo
 Hong Jong-hyun as Go Jin-se
 Choi Yeo-jin as Baek In-kyung

Supporting
 Bae Noo-ri as Hong Ran
 Gu Bon-seung as Do Han-soo
 Park Si-eun as Kang Myung-jin
 Yoon Park as Park Ho-gi
 Cho Min-ah as Moon Je-ni
 Moon Jung-soo as Lee Sung-rak

Original soundtrack

Ratings

Notes

References

External links
  
 
 

JTBC television dramas
Korean-language television shows
2012 South Korean television series debuts
2012 South Korean television series endings
Television shows based on Japanese novels
Television series by Drama House